Md. Mahmudul Haque Imran (born 5 September 1991), also known as Imran Mahmudul or Imran, is a Bangladeshi music composer and playback singer whose songs has been featured in different albums and movies. He was the first runner-up of Channel i Sera Kontho - 2008. He also won Best Male Singer at the Meril Prothom Alo Awards for the song "Dil Dil Dil" from the 2016 film Bossgiri.

Early life
Imran was born on 5 September 1991, in Konapara, Jatrabari, Dhaka. He was a student at Dhaka Engineering University School and College.

Career
Mahmudul learned composition and sound engineering from Arfin Rumey and started his career singing in the movie Bhalobashar Lal Golap with Sabina Yasmin in 2008. He worked in the mixed album named Rongdhanu with another participant from Channel I Sera Kontho, Sharmin. His first studio album was Shopnoloke composed by Arfin Rumey. Sabina Yasmin, Nijhu and Sabrina Porshi sang along with him in this album. "Fire Eshona" is a 2014 song that became the second most viewed Bangladeshi song on YouTube of 2014.

Discography

Studio albums

Extended plays

Singles

Accolades

|-
| 2014
| Imran Mahmudul 
| Best Singer (Male)
| Meril Prothom Alo Awards
| 
| "Hridoyer Patay" from album Tumi Hina
|
|-
| 2015
| Imran Mahmudul
| Best Singer (Male)
| Meril Prothom Alo Awards
| 
| "Bahudora" From album "Bahudora"
|-
|2016
| Imran Mahmudul
|Best Singer (Male)
|Meril Prothom Alo Awards
|
| "Dil Dil Dil" from soundtrack Bossgiri
|
|-
|2017
| Imran Mahmudul
|Best Singer (Male)
|Meril Prothom Alo Awards
|
|"Dhoa"
|-
|2018
| Imran Mahmudul
|Best Singer (Male)
|Meril Prothom Alo Awards
|
| "O Hey Shyam" from soundtrack PoraMon 2
|-
|2019
| Imran Mahmudul
|Best Singer (Male)
|BBFA
|
| "SWAG" from soundtrack Password
|-
|2021
| Imran Mahmudul
|Best Singer (Male)
|CJFB Performance Award
|
|Tui Ki Amar Hobi Re
|
|}

References

External links
 
 
 Imran Mahmudul Official Youtube Channel

Living people
Bangladeshi composers
1989 births
21st-century Bangladeshi male singers
CJFB Performance Award Winners